is a Japanese illustrator and manga artist. She is the wife of manga artist Hiroyuki Utatane.

Works
Karakuri Ninja Girl (original creator)

Manga
Listed chronologically.
Koakuma Hihyōkan (小悪魔秘宝館, March 1988, Shobunkan)
Fuwa Fuwa Cotton Kibun (ふわふわコットン気分, March 1989, Shobunkan)
Nijiiro Daireikai (匂艶大霊界, June 1990, Akane Shinsha)
Lunarium (月光宮, March 1993, Niji no Tabi Shuppan)
Milky Morning (ミルキ-モ-ニング, August 1993, Akane Shinsha)
Momoiro Hyaku Monogatari (ももいろ百物語, September 1993, Shobunkan)
Half Moon ni Kawaru made (ハーフムーンにかわるまで, October 1993, France Shoin)
Pretty Afternoon (プリティアフタヌーン, October 1993, Akane Shinsha)
Misty Twilight (ミスティートワイライト, November 1993, Akane Shinsha)
Artemis (アルテミス, December 1993, Shobunkan)
Silky Midnight (シルキー ミッドナイト, December 1993, Akane Shinsha)
Lunagenic Doll (ルナジェニック・ドール, March 1995, France Shoin)
Debut (誕生~Debut~, September 1996, Media Works
Private Peach (プライベート・ピーチ, July 1998, France Shoin)
Melon Scandal (メロン・スキャンダル, September 1998, France Shoin)
Sparkling Cherry (スパ-クリング・チェリ-, November 1998, France Shoin)
Luminous Girls (月煌少女, December 1999, France Shoin)
Ninpō Midare Karakuri! (忍法乱れからくり!, March 2002, France Shoin)
Shiritsu Dengeki Jogakuin Seifuku Zukan (私立電撃女学院制服図鑑, February 2004, Media Works)

Sources:

References

External links
 

Year of birth missing (living people)
Living people
Japanese illustrators
Manga artists